Forbidden is a 1953 American film noir crime film directed by Rudolph Mate and starring Tony Curtis, Joanne Dru and Lyle Bettger.

Plot
Eddie Darrow (Tony Curtis) works for American gangster Barney Pendleton, who sends him to Macao to find a woman, Christine Lawrence, and bring her back to the United States. Aware of a previous romantic attraction between the two, Pendleton tells his thug Chalmer to follow Eddie on the trip, just in case.

At a nightclub and casino, Eddie saves the owner, Justin Keit, from some Chinese men attacking him. A grateful Justin invites him home and introduces Eddie to his fiancée, Christine. Eddie is bitter because Christine had run off to marry a criminal named Manard, who is now dead. A jealous Justin overhears Christine explain to Eddie that she only wed Manard because he threatened to harm Eddie. She also says Pendleton wants her back because she has hidden documents that could land him behind bars.

In order to keep an eye on Eddie, Justin offers him a job at the casino. There he befriends an Asian piano player named Allan. A local gambler named Hon-Fai is robbed and killed, and Eddie suspects Justin could be behind this. Christine makes it clear she does not love Justin, and she and Eddie passionately kiss. Chalmer shows himself, suspecting that Eddie has decided to take Christine for himself and flee. Eddie denies this, claiming that he fully intends to follow Pendleton's orders and bring Christine back to the States. Christine overhears this and angrily decides to marry Justin.

As a gang war breaks out, Chalmer is killed and Justin does indeed turn out to be a ruthless criminal. Allan, the pianist, reveals himself to be an undercover agent of the law. He is able to get Eddie and Christine on board a boat leaving for San Francisco, and when Justin tries to pursue them, he ends up on a boat that explodes.

Cast
 Tony Curtis as Eddie 
 Joanne Dru as Christine 
 Lyle Bettger as Justin 
 Marvin Miller as Chalmer
 Victor Sen Yung as Allan 
 Peter Mamakos as Sam (as Peter J. Mamakos)
 Mai Tai Sing as Soo Lee (as Mae Tai Sing)
 Howard Chuman as Hon-Fai
Weaver Levy as Tang

See also
 List of American films of 1953

References

External links
 
 
 
 
 
  (Mamie Van Doren performance, dubbed by Virginia Rees

1953 films
1950s crime thriller films
American crime thriller films
American black-and-white films
Film noir
Films set in Macau
Universal Pictures films
Films scored by Frank Skinner
1950s English-language films
1950s American films